Edna Wallace Hopper (January 17, 1872 – December 14, 1959) was an American actress on stage and in silent films. She was known as the "eternal flapper".

Biography

Hopper was believed to have been born on January 17, 1872, as Edna Margaret Augusta Wallace in San Francisco, California to Josephine and Waller Wallace. Hopper claimed her birth records were destroyed in the 1906 San Francisco earthquake. Her father was the head night usher at the California Theater. She had one sibling.

Hopper trained for the stage in New York. While there, she had married DeWolf Hopper on June 28, 1893. They appeared in several comic operas together, including John Philip Sousa's El Capitan, before divorcing in 1898. The couple presented a striking physical contrast on stage. DeWolf stood 6 ft 5 or 6 in, while Hopper stood under five feet tall and weighed less than 100 pounds.

Hopper starred in her most famous role, Lady Holyrood in the popular musical Florodora, which had premiered in London. Though not part of the renowned Florodora Sextette, she shared in some of the wild adulation of male admirers who mobbed the stage door after every performance.

Hopper remained active over the next decade, starring in George M. Cohan's Fifty Miles from Boston in 1907.  She married Wall Street broker Albert Oldfield Brown in 1908. Her professional activity lessened in the 1910s but resumed in the 1920s. One of the earlier stage actors to have a facelift, Wallace Hopper had the operation filmed and then made personal appearance tours over the next eight years showing the film and revealing beauty tips. (Many decades later, veteran actress Jeanne Cooper would follow a similar path and have her own facelift procedure filmed and shown on the soap opera on which she had been appearing, The Young and the Restless.) 

Hopper became associated with a line of personal care products and cosmetics, Edna Wallace Hopper Cosmetics, sold by American Home Products. In 1953, she performed the same role she had begun her acting career with in 1893, at the final performance at the Empire Theater in Manhattan, which was scheduled for demolition. The June 8, 1953, issue of Life Magazine featured an article on Hopper, considering her a popular stage actress and singer during the turn of the 20th century.

Hopper had separated from her second husband by 1923 and moved from New York to Los Angeles. She went on to become a stock trader and was the first (and, during her tenure, only) woman of the thirty-six member board of L. F. Rothschild & Co.

Death
Edna Wallace Hopper died on December 14, 1959, in New York City. She is buried in Mountain View Cemetery in Oakland, California.

References

External links

Edna Hopper at Find a Grave

Edna Wallace Hopper photo gallery at NY Public Library

19th-century American actresses
American stage actresses
20th-century American actresses
American silent film actresses
Vaudeville performers
1959 deaths
1872 births
Burials at Mountain View Cemetery (Oakland, California)
American stock traders
Women stock traders